The Etv Oriya Film Awards started in the year 2010 to honor Orissa film artists & technician. Awards have been instituted in 14 categories that include the best film, best director, best actor, best actress, best supporting actor, best supporting actress, best villain, best play back singers (male and female separately), best music composer, best comedian, best child artist and best debut actors (both male and female), Lifetime Achievement Award have conferred on a prominent and pioneering personality of the Oriya film industry for significant contribution to cinema.

1st Etv Oriya Film Awards 2010

2nd Etv Oriya Film Awards 2011

3rd Etv Oriya Film Awards 2012

4th Etv Oriya Film Awards 2013

See also
Ollywood films of 2009
Ollywood films of 2010

References 

Indian film awards
Cinema of Odisha
Awards established in 2010
2010 establishments in Orissa
Odisha awards